Los signos del zodiaco is a 1963 Mexican drama film directed by Sergio Véjar. It was entered into the 3rd Moscow International Film Festival.

Cast
 Kitty de Hoyos as María
 Angélica María as Sofía
 Pilar Souza as Ana Romana
 Luis Bayardo as Pedro Rojo
 Mario García González as Daniel
 Enrique Aguilar as Augusto Sotomayor
 María Eugenia Ríos as Estela
 Marta Zamora as Polita
 Angeles Marrufo
 Yolanda Guillaumin (as Yolanda Guillomán)
 Socorro Avelar as Justina

References

External links
 

1963 films
1963 drama films
1960s Spanish-language films
Mexican black-and-white films
Mexican drama films
1960s Mexican films